Bye Bye Birdie is a 1995 musical comedy television film directed by Gene Saks with a screenplay by Michael Stewart based on his book of the 1960 stage musical of the same name. It features music and lyrics by Charles Strouse and Lee Adams respectively. It stars Jason Alexander and Vanessa Williams and features Chynna Phillips, Tyne Daly, Marc Kudisch, George Wendt, and Sally Mayes. It was produced by RHI Entertainment and released by ABC on December 3, 1995. It is the second film adaptation of the musical, the first being in 1963.

Plot 
In 1959, it is announced that Conrad Birdie (loosely based on Elvis Presley), the most popular rock and roll singer, is to be drafted into the army, upsetting teenagers across the country. Included in this group is Albert Peterson, Birdie's manager and songwriter, and Rose 'Rosie' Alvarez, his long-time girlfriend. Rose tells Albert that she wants him to leave the music and study to become an English teacher at NYU ("An English Teacher"). However, Albert's mother, Mae, wants him to continue managing Al-mae-lou, the music studio she and Albert created. Rosie comes up with an idea for one final public stunt before Birdie's drafting. She plans to pick a girl from a stack of names and send Birdie to kiss her and sing one final song on live television. Kim MacAfee from Sweet Apple, Ohio is chosen but all the phone lines there are busy. This is due to the news that Kim got pinned to Hugo Peabody ("The Telephone Hour").

In Sweet Apple, Kim has decided to mature herself into a grown woman ("How Lovely To Be A Woman") but quickly loses this mentality when she learns that she will be kissed by Birdie. Albert and Rosie arrive in Sweet Apple and Albert confronts a girl about being too old to date Birdie when he comes back from war ("Put On A Happy Face"). Conrad arrives and Albert and Rosie feed reporters false stories in an attempt to clean up his past ("A Healthy, Normal American Boy"). Hugo worries that Birdie's arrival will cause Kim to break up with him, but she assures him that Conrad means nothing to her ("One Boy"). Though everyone is ablaze about Birdie's arrival, Rosie is still upset about Albert's career choice ("Let's Settle Down").

Birdie is awarded a key to the city by the mayor of Sweet Apple but the ceremony breaks into chaos when he begins singing ("Honestly Sincere"). Harry MacAfee, Kim's father, is frustrated about all the commotion in the town and in their house, as Birdie is now staying in their home, but Albert makes him feel better by promising that he and the rest of the MacAfee's will all be featured on The Ed Sullivan Show ("Hymn For A Sunday Evening (Ed Sullivan)"). During the broadcast ("One Last Kiss"), Hugo, with the help of Rosie, punches Conrad before he kisses Kim. Rosie goes back to the MacAfee home and packs her things as she regrets her relationship with Albert ("What Did I Ever See In Him"). Kim wants to join Rosie but she doesn't allow it. However, Kim sneaks out anyway to go on a date with Birdie and hang out with the rest of the teens. The parents of Sweet Apple soon learn that all their children are missing and Harry reminisces over a time where children obeyed their parents ("Kids").

Rosie has ended up in Maude's Bar where she tells the men sitting at the counter that she is single ("Spanish Rose"). Albert calls the bar, begging Rosie for her forgiveness ("Talk To Me") but gets none from her. Meanwhile, Kim and Conrad are hiding from their parents in "the ice house" but she leaves when Conrad begins to pressure her into sexual intercourse. Albert and Rosie, looking for the teens, are stopped by Mae who tries to convince Albert to stay in the music business again. He finally stand up for himself and she dramatically says her goodbyes to the world ("A Mother Doesn't Matter Anymore"). He proudly leaves his mother alone ("A Giant Step") and continues to search for Kim. Meanwhile, Conrad is arrested by the police for statutory rape. Sometime later, Conrad (dressed as Rosie) and Albert are seen at a train station where they are expecting Mae. His mother arrives and he puts them both on a train out of Ohio, left alone to bicker with one another. Rosie comes rushing in, worrying that they have missed the train but Albert assures her that it was part of a plan. He tells her that he plans to take a teaching position in Pumpkin Falls, Iowa and proposes to her, claiming that he must be married to take the position. She happily accepts and he reflects on all her wonderful qualities ("Rosie").

Cast

 Jason Alexander as Albert J. Peterson
 Vanessa Williams as Rose 'Rosie' Alvarez
 Chynna Phillips as Kim MacAfee
 Tyne Daly as Mae Peterson
 Marc Kudisch as Conrad Birdie
 George Wendt as Harry MacAfee
 Sally Mayes as Doris MacAfee
 Jason Gaffney as Hugo F. Peabody
 Blair Slater as Randolph MacAfee
 Vicki Lewis as Gloria Rasputin
 Brigitta Dau as Ursula Merkle
 Angela Brydon - The Sad Face Girl
 Jay Brazeau as The Mayor
 Nicole Robert as Edna, The Mayor's Wife
 Garry Chalk as Maude
 Capper McIntyrre as Mr. Johnson
 Sheelah Megill as Mrs. Merkle"

Teens 

 Shelley S. Hunt as Alice
 Marlowe Windsor-Menard as Suzie
 Brenna Quan as Penelope-Ann
 Angela Quinn as Debra Sue
 Debbie Timuss as Nancy
 Julie Tomaino as Margie
 Chiara Zanni as Helen
 Kristian Ayre as Harvey Johnson
 Duane Keogh as Freddie
 Chancz Perry as Karl

Musical Numbers

 "Main Title (Bye Bye Birdie)" - Orchestra
 "An English Teacher" - Rosie
 "The Telephone Hour" - The Teens
 "How Lovely To Be A Woman" - Kim
 "Bye Bye Birdie"- The Teen Girls
 "Put On a Happy Face" - Albert
 "A Healthy, Normal American Boy" - Albert, Rosie, Teens
 "One Boy" - Kim, Teens
 "Let's Settle Down" - Rosie
 "Honestly Sincere" - Conrad
 "Hymn for a Sunday Evening (Ed Sullivan)" - Harry, Doris, Kim, Randolph
 "One Last Kiss" - Conrad
 "What Did I Ever See In Him" - Rosie, Kim
 "A Lot of Livin' to Do" - Conrad, Kim, Teens
 "Kids" - Harry, Mae
 "Spanish Rose" - Rosie
 "Talk To Me" - Albert
 "A Mother Doesn't Matter Anymore" - Mae
 "A Giant Step" - Albert
 "Rosie" - Albert, Rosie
 "End Credits (Bye Bye Birdie)" - Kim, Orchestra

Reception 
The TV movie won an Emmy Award in 1996 for Outstanding Music and Lyrics, and was nominated for Outstanding Music Direction and Outstanding Hairstyling for a Miniseries or a Special.

References

External links

All articles lacking in-text citations
1995 films
Musical television films
1990s musical comedy films
1995 romantic comedy films
1990s teen films
American romantic comedy films
Films set in Ohio
Films based on musicals
Rock musicals
Fiction set in the 1950s
Films set in the 1950s
Films set in 1959
Musicals by Charles Strouse
Musicals by Michael Stewart (playwright)
American musical comedy films
American television films
1990s English-language films
Films directed by Gene Saks
1990s American films